The 2016 EMF Euro is the seventh edition of the EMF miniEURO for national Small-sided football teams, and the fifth governed by the European Minifootball Federation. It is hosted in Székesfehérvár, Hungary, from 21 to 27 August 2016.

The final tournament was contested by 32 teams.

Draw 
The final tournament draw was held in Székesfehérvár on 24 February 2016.

Group stage

Group A

Group B

Group C

Group D

Group E

Group F

Group G

Group H

Knockout stage

Bracket

Round of 16

Quarter-finals

Semi finals

Bronze medal game

Final

Final ranking

References

External links
 Official EMF website
 EMF Euro official website

2016
International association football competitions hosted by Hungary
2016 in European sport
2016 in Hungarian sport
Sport in Székesfehérvár